The European Soundmix Show 1999 was the fourth European Soundmix Show.

Like the previous contests, this one was held in Amsterdam, and the winner was the host, the Netherlands with Cherwin Muringen imitating Seal.

Results

References

European Soundmix Show
1999 in music
1999 in the Netherlands